The International Federation of Model Auto Racing (IFMAR) is the world governing body of professional radio controlled car racing.

The organization was created in 1979 by professional racer and RC model entrepreneur Ted Longshaw. At that time, many different governing bodies operated under their own rules throughout the world.  IFMAR was conceived as a way to bring the different, fragmented organizations under a single, governing body. IFMAR's constitution also promotes international friendship and sportsmanship.

Each of the member blocs organises the IFMAR World Championship event on behalf of IFMAR.

Masami Hirosaka is perhaps the world's most distinguished racer. He has a record of 14 IFMAR World Championships, followed by Lamberto Collari with 9 titles, all within a single category and in nitro powered cars.

Governing bodies

IFMAR governs RC racing through four international governing bodies, or "blocs" representing 45 member nations and with full voting rights:

 European Federation of Radio Operated Model Automobiles (EFRA) – Oversees racing in Europe.
 Far East Model Car Association (FEMCA) – Governs Australasia and Asia.
 Remotely Operated Auto Racers (ROAR) – Oversees and promotes races in Canada and the United States of America and is credited with producing more world champion drivers than any other bloc.
 Fourth Association of Model Auto Racing (FAMAR) – The newest IFMAR bloc and oversees Argentina, Brazil, Colombia, Ecuador, Mexico, Peru, South Africa, Uruguay, Chile  and Venezuela.

Secretariat

Presidents

Eligibility to IFMAR World Championship event
To be allowed to compete in an IFMAR World Championship event, the competitor has to be a member of a national body (such as ROAR of North America, SARDA from South Africa, BRCA from the United Kingdom, etc.). The competitor has to contact a representative of the body who will determine if they are competent enough to compete in the world championship round. The driver does not specifically have to have qualified in that discipline in which they choose to race (e.g. a driver who is competent in 1:10 on road racing wishes to qualify for 1:8 off-road).

IFMAR World Championship Winners

Statistics

Most Wins 
NB: Excludes World Cup winners

Updated as of 10 November 2022

Drivers

Car manufacturers

IC Engines

Electric Motors

By Member Blocs (Drivers)

Win(s) by Nations (Drivers)

Most Wins in a single season

Drivers

Consecutive Wins

Drivers

Car manufacturers

Most Top Qualifiers (TQ) 
Updated as of 10 November 2022

Most Finals appearances

A-main/finals appearances
Drivers with at least 10 finals appearances are listed

Italics: drivers who have not or yet to have won a Worlds title.

Bold: drivers who have actively appeared in a final race within the two previous Worlds

Despite his last A-main appearance being in 2005, he inherited the title after Ralph Burch Jr. finally won his first title in 2010 having tried since 1981 at the age of 13. Ryan Maifield claimed the honor from Drescher in 2013, who held it until he win his off-road double in 2017.

Updated as of 10 November 2022

Podium finishers 
Drivers with at least 5 podium finishes are listed

Italics: drivers who have not or yet to have won a Worlds title.

Bold: drivers who have actively appeared in a final race within the two previous Worlds

Updated as of 10 November 2022

Notes

References

Sources
n.b. all championship winners and other info to do with it are sourced from the following sites.
ROARRACING.com
EFRA.ws
IFMAR.org
YMR Modellbilens Hall of Fame
https://web.archive.org/web/20110611090123/http://www.nil.org/RC/ifmar-1-8ic-results.html
TODOS LOS RESULTADOS AUTOMODELEROS

External links
 IFMAR official website
 Nitro Modelismo - Internet Magazine to divulgue RC Car Model Races in Brazil
 2002 IFMAR 1:10 200mm Sedan World Cup

 
International sports organizations
Radio-controlled car racing organizations
Sports organizations established in 1979